The Oceanic-class ocean liner was an iron-hulled ocean liner class operated by White Star Line. It is the first modern ocean liner class and the fastest ship class from 1872–1875 until the completion of Germanic.

Ships in class 
SS Oceanic
SS Atlantic
SS Baltic
SS Republic
SS Adriatic
SS Celtic

References

Ships of the White Star Line
Ocean liner classes
Ships built in Belfast
Steamships of the United Kingdom
Ships built by Harland and Wolff
Passenger ships of the United Kingdom

The Oceanic Class ocean liners were the first liners built for the White Star Line. They often consisted of A Single propeller, single Funnel and relied mainly on sailpower